Jesus Songko Lapid (October 5, 1933 – July 13, 1968) was a Filipino actor and father of actor, diving instructor, fight director Jess Lapid Jr. He was given a movie screen name Jess Lapid. His older brother is Jose Lapid, father of Lito Lapid.

He was shot dead inside a nightclub in Quezon City on July 13, 1968.

Early life
He was born Jesus Lapid on October 5, 1933, in Guagua, Pampanga; an older brother, Jose, is the father and grandfather of movie stars-turned politicians Lito Lapid (now a Senator), and son Mark Lapid (former governor of Pampanga and now TIEZA Head) respectively. Jess started as an extra in his first film from Premiere Productions, “Larawan ng Pag-Ibig” in 1961. He then shifted to being a stuntman, after finding out that they earned more than extras.

Career
He rose to become the top stuntman of Premiere, often doubling for more established stars—riding horses, falling from cliffs, getting shot at by villains. He had the good fortune for doubling for Fernando Poe Jr., and soon, the two would become fast friends.

When Poe ventured into film productions, he made Jess one of the regulars in his films, giving him roles that required real acting, rather than choreographed stunt actions. Jess rose to the occasion and proved to be a convincing character actor. He tried him out in “Pasong Diablo”, in 1961.

It was in the FPJ Productions, “Sierra Madre” (1963) that Poe decided to give Jess the full star treatment—from a more prominent billing to major publicity exposures. But it was Jess himself who pulled it off, by turning in a sensational performance that erased all doubts about his just being a “mere stuntman”.

It was Tagalog Ilang-Ilang Productions picked him up and eventually made him into a superstar in the movie “Kardong Kidlat” (1964) which became such a smashing success at the box office tills. At the Globe Theater where the movie was launched, a long queue of movie fans lined up around the building just to get in and watch the talk-of-the-town film.

1964 proved to be a bright and busy year for Jess, appearing in movies like “Bilis at Tapang” with Romeo Vasquez and “Deadly Brothers” with Joseph Estrada. He co-starred with Vic Vargas in “7 Kilabot ng Barilan”. In 1968, Jess appeared alongside action movie greats Fernando Poe Jr. and Joseph Estrada in “3 Hari”, an FPJ productions offering.

As he was raking it in, he invested in his own film outfit, Jela Productions, and began producing his own movies.

Personal life
Of his 3 children, one went on to follow in his footsteps. His namesake, Jess Lapid Jr. also became a movie actor, and a film and fight director, and also now currently a scuba diving instructor. He appeared in a 1980 spin-off film that made his father famous, “Ang Bagong Kardong Kidlat”. Jess Jr. capped his career with a Best Supporting Actor award for the movie “Lumayo Ka Man Sa Akin” in 1993.

The senior Jess can very well rest happy with the thought that the Lapid name, through his son, nephew and grandnephews, continue to contribute to the lively art of film-making in the Philippines.

Filmography

Movies

Death and legacy
After wrapping up the movie “Simaron Brothers” with Jun Aristorenas, on the night of 13 July 1968, Jess Lapid Sr. was shot to death at the Lanai Nightclub after an altercation between two groups of movie personalities. Persistent reports linked the incident to another Kapampangan actress, Nancy Roman, also his leading lady. A suspect, Mario Henson, gave himself up to the police, and at least one gunman from Angeles was implicated in the crime. Jess was brought to the National Orthopedic Hospital but was pronounced dead on arrival. He was 34 years old.

“Simaron Brothers” was shown post-humously at the Globe Theater, and the blurb capitalized on his sensational death by touting his last movie as a “picture that will project the living image of Jess Lapid in the hearts of millions..”.

As a belated tribute, his nephew Lito Lapid appeared as Jess Lapid in the biopic “The Jess Lapid Story”, released in 1978.  He also immortalized the iconic role of Leon Guerrero, first originated by Jess in the 1968 film, “Leon Guerrero: Laban sa 7 Kilabot”".
His remains is at Guagua Cemetery in Pampanga

1933 births
1968 deaths
Male actors from Pampanga
Kapampangan people
Filipino male child actors
Deaths by stabbing in the Philippines
Deaths by firearm in the Philippines
People murdered in the Philippines
Filipino murder victims
20th-century Filipino male actors
Filipino male film actors